Hugh McCulloch (1808–1895) was an American statesman.

Hugh McCulloch may also refer to:

Hugh McCulloch (poet) (1869–1902), American poet
Hugh McCulloch, first editor of the Journal of the American Academy of Pediatrics
USRC Hugh McCulloch, the name of more than one cutter of the United States Revenue Cutter service

See also 
USCGC McCulloch
USS McCulloch (1897)

McCulloch, Hugh